The Journal of Computational and Nonlinear Dynamics is a quarterly peer-reviewed multidisciplinary scientific journal covering the study of nonlinear dynamics. It was established in 2006 and is published by the American Society of Mechanical Engineers. The editor-in-chief is Balakumar Balachandran (University of Maryland). According to the Journal Citation Reports, the journal has a 2017 impact factor of 1.996.

References

External links

Multidisciplinary scientific journals
Publications established in 2006
Quarterly journals
Dynamics (mechanics)
English-language journals
Systems science literature
American Society of Mechanical Engineers academic journals